Figueres–Vilafant is a railway station serving the city of Figueres in Catalonia, Spain. The station is on the Perpignan–Barcelona high-speed rail line and is served by Renfe Operadora's AVE and SNCF's TGV high-speed trains.

From  on, through services run between Paris, Lyon, Marseille and Toulouse to Barcelona and Madrid.

The station is also connected to the Spanish broad gauge railway network thanks to a branch that links it with the Barcelona–Cerbère conventional railway line near Vilamalla.

The general plan was to move all trains for the Figueres area to this station and close the current Figueres station. This location and that the station is only accessible by one road has been the subject of some comment in the local press. Opposition to the station location as well as the eventual plan to move all train service (local, medium, and long-distance and international) to this station has forced it to be deemed a "provisional station" until the matter can be resolved.

References

External links
 
 Figueres-Vilafant listing at Adif website
 Information and photos of the station at Trenscat.com 

Madrid–Barcelona high-speed rail line
Railway stations in Catalonia
Railway stations in Spain opened in 2010
Transport in Alt Empordà
Transport in Figueres